João Soares de Albergaria (c. 1415 – 1499), also referred to as João Soares (or João Soares Velho), was the second Portuguese Dontary-Captain of the islands of Santa Maria and São Miguel, succeeding his maternal uncle Gonçalo Velho Cabral in the title. After selling his rights to the Captaincy of São Miguel to Rui Gonçalves da Câmara, he continued as Donatary-Captain of Santa Maria.

Biography

Early life
João Soares de Albergaria was the son of Fernão Soares de Albergaria and Teresa Velho Cabral, the latter a sister of Gonçalo Velho Cabral.

He married Brites Godins, who quickly became sick. Their marriage would not produce heirs. In 1474, due to his wife's illness, Albergaria moved to the island of Madeira in order to "find remedies and medics", as well as a milder climate for her to convalesce in. They lodged with the family of the Captain of Funchal João Gonçalves Zarco and that of his brother, Rui Gonçalves da Câmara. Beatriz, Duchess of Viseu and Diogo, Duke of Viseu approved this contract, and King Afonso V of Portugal ratified it on 10 March 1474.

Captaincy

During his captaincy, Albergaria promoted settlement of Santa Maria—attracting settlers from both Portugal (mainly Algarve) and continental Europe—and founded the principal village of Vila do Porto. It became the base for future Captains-Generals in the Azores. Before this, his maternal uncle Gonçalo Velho Cabral had been "Commander of Santa Maria and Captain of the Azores" within a structural framework that was not properly defined. In contrast, King Afonso V explicitly approved João Soares de Albergaria's captaincy in a 1474 edict:

As captain-general Albergaria was also responsible for the island's defense. However, in 1480 a Castilian corsair attacked Vila do Porto during the War of the Castilian Succession, sacking the town. Albergaria was captured and taken prisoner to Castile, where he was ransomed. He paid his own ransom eight days before peace were declared by Afonso V and Ferdinand of Castile at the end of 1480.

Later life
Albergaria later married Branca de Sousa Falcão, daughter of João de Sousa Falcão, 1st Lord de Figueiredo and 1st Lord of the Manor de Fataúnços, and D. Maria de Almada. They married on 20 June 1492 on the orders of King João II. They had at least four children together:
 João Soares de Sousa, who would inherit his father's title as 3rd Donatary-Captain of Santa Maria;
 Pedro Soares, who died overseas in Portuguese India;
 D. Maria, who married in Portugal; and
 D. Violante, who married a Castilian in Santa Maria.

Albergaria returned to Santa Maria from Madeira late in life. He died there in 1499 at 80 years of age. The captaincy of Santa Maria passed on to his descendants until its extinction in 1667, following the death Brás Soares de Sousa in 1664.

References
Notes

Sources
 
 
 
 

Soares Joao
1415 births
1499 deaths
15th-century Portuguese people